Phaya Thai station is a rapid transit station on the Airport Rail Link and Sukhumvit Line in Ratchathewi District, Bangkok, Thailand. The Airport Rail Link station is located above the mainline Eastern Railway at a level crossing on Phaya Thai Road. There is a direct interchange to the BTS Sukhumvit Line. The station is surrounded by the government buildings, office towers and condominiums along Phaya Thai and Si Ayutthaya Road. Suan Pakkad Palace, Traditional Thai antiques Museum and Gallery is nearby to the east of the station.

The station is the terminus of the Airport Rail Link City Line to Suvarnabhumi Airport.

Gallery

See also
 Suvarnabhumi Airport Link

Airport Rail Link (Bangkok) stations
Ratchathewi district
BTS Skytrain stations